When We Wuz Bangin' 1989–1999: The Hitz is the first greatest hits compilation released by American rap group Compton's Most Wanted and its lead member MC Eiht. The album was released January 23, 2001, on Capitol Records. It features songs from Compton's Most Wanted albums, MC Eiht albums as well as rare and hard to find songs compiled from singles, soundtracks and guest appearances.

Track listing
"One Time Gaffled 'em Up" - 3:56 (from the album It's a Compton Thang)
"Duck Sick" - 4:30 (from the album It's a Compton Thang)
"Late Night Hype" - 4:48 (from the album It's a Compton Thang)
"Whose Is It?" (Give It Up, pt. 2) - 5:23 (from the single "I'm Wit Dat")
"Growin' Up in the Hood" - 4:12 (from the album Straight Checkn 'Em)
"I'm Wit Dat" - 4:53 (from the album It's a Compton Thang)
"N 2 Deep" (featuring Scarface) - 3:51 (from the album Music to Driveby)
"Def Wish II" (DJ Premier Remix) - 4:12 (from the single "Def Wish II")
"All for the Money" - 4:06 (from the album We Come Strapped)
"1990-Sick" (Kill 'em All) (featuring Spice 1) - 4:26 (from the album 1990-Sick)
"Streiht Up Menace" - 4:34 (from the album Menace II Society)
"Automatic" - 4:16 (from the album Section 8)
"Days of '89" - 4:50 (from the album Section 8)

References

External links 
 When We Wuz Bangin' 1989-1999: The Hitz at Discogs

Compton's Most Wanted albums
2001 greatest hits albums
Albums produced by DJ Premier
Albums produced by Fredwreck
Capitol Records compilation albums
West Coast hip hop compilation albums
Gangsta rap compilation albums